Bentos may refer to:
 Alejandro de la Cruz Bentos, an Argentine footballer
 Gustavo Bentos, a Uruguayan footballer
 Benthos, the community of marine organisms which live on, in, or near the seabed, also known as the benthic zone

See also
 Fray Bentos (disambiguation)